Jeff Cambridge (born 22 November 1966) is a Canadian retired association football player who earned 7 caps for the Canadian national side between 1984 and 1987. He played club football for Winnipeg Fury from 1987 to 1990.

Cambridge has been active since retiring as a youth soccer coach in London, Ontario.

References

External links
 
 

1966 births
Living people
Canada men's international soccer players
Canadian soccer players
Canadian people of English descent
Soccer players from London, Ontario
Winnipeg Fury players
Canadian Soccer League (1987–1992) players
Canada men's youth international soccer players
Association football midfielders
London Lasers players